Deportivo Petapa was a Guatemalan football team based in San Miguel Petapa, and currently plays in the Primera División de Ascenso. Their home stadium was Estadio Julio Armando Cobar, which has been converted to artificial turf due to the heavy rains that frequently hit the region.

History
Founded in 1979, Sport Club Petapa Velásquez were named after a significant sportsman of the municipality. They clinched their first promotion to Guatemala's top division in 2001 and their second in 2005.

Current squads

 (2007–2010)

 (2012)

 (2009)

 (2010–2015)

List of coaches
  Gustavo Faral (2000–2001)
  Juan Alberto Salguero (2008-2009)
  Héctor Tatuaca (- Nov 2011)
  Irwing Olivares (Nov 2011- Dec 2011)
  Ramiro Cepeda (Dec 2011 – May 2012)
  Cristóbal Maldonado (May 2012 -September 2012)
  Carlos Ruiz (September 2012-Mar 2013)
  Pablo Centrone (March 2013-May 2016)
  Ramiro Cepeda (May 2016-May 2018)
  Rafael Loredo (May 2018-)

References

External links

 
Football clubs in Guatemala
Association football clubs established in 1979
1979 establishments in Guatemala